"Oh Boy" is a 2002 Grammy-nominated hip hop single by Cam'ron from his album Come Home with Me, and features Juelz Santana. "Boy" is an obscure slang term for heroin.

The song samples "I'm Going Down" by Rose Royce. It held the number one chart on the Hot R&B/Hip-Hop Singles for five weeks straight. It also held the number one chart on the Hot Rap Tracks. It peaked at number four on the Billboard Hot 100. The song is produced by Just Blaze who originally made it for Memphis Bleek. The song ranked 89th on VH1's 100 Greatest Songs of Hip Hop.

Music video
The video was filmed in Harlem, Manhattan, New York City, New York. The video features cameo appearances from Damon Dash, La La Vazquez, Angie Martinez, Free Marie, DJ Stretch Armstrong, and Huddy 6.

Remixes
The official remix of this song entitled "Oh Girl (Oh Boy Remix)", features Birdman, TQ, and Jim Jones. Jay-Z was also to be on the remix, but his verse was removed by Cam'ron due to the verse containing a diss track to Jay-Z's then-rival rapper Nas.

Mariah Carey recorded and released an answer song to "Oh Boy" in 2002 for her ninth album Charmbracelet called, "Boy (I Need You)". The song features samples from "I'm Going Down" by Rose Royce. Cam'ron also appeared on the song. The remix version also features Cam'ron, Juelz Santana, Jim Jones, and Freeway. It was referred as "Oh Boy Part 3". It is the 2nd official remix of "Oh Boy". The song & the remix version was also produced by Just Blaze.

Lil Wayne freestyled over the instrumental on his 2002 mixtape, SQ1.

Charts

Weekly charts

Year-end charts

Certifications

References

2002 singles
Cam'ron songs
Juelz Santana songs
Music videos directed by Bryan Barber
Song recordings produced by Just Blaze
Songs written by Cam'ron
Roc-A-Fella Records singles
Def Jam Recordings singles
Universal Music Group singles
Songs written by Juelz Santana
Songs written by Just Blaze
2002 songs